Jim Reeves Writes You a Record is a studio album by Jim Reeves, released posthumously in 1971 on RCA Victor. It was produced by Chet Atkins.

Track listing

Charts

References 

1971 albums
Jim Reeves albums
RCA Victor albums
Albums produced by Chet Atkins
Albums published posthumously